Sickle and Hammer is a 1921 Russian silent drama film directed by Vladimir Gardin.  It is an agit-film that is longer than the usual at six reels because the norm is two reels only or twenty minutes. The story is about a peasant worker who went to the city to become a factory worker, then he eventually fights in the World War and after this, he returns to his own village as a Red Army commander.

Cast
 Aleksandr Gromov as Ivan Gorbov  
 Anatoli Gorchilin as Pyotr  
 N. Zubova as Agasha 
 Vsevolod Pudovkin as Andrey  
 Sergey Komarov
 Ye. Bedunkevich
 N. Belyakov 
 Anna Chekulaeva
 A. Golovanov
 Y. Kaverina
 M. Kudelko 
 Feofan Shipulinsky 
 N. Vishnyak

References

Bibliography 
 Sargeant, Amy. Vsevolod Pudovkin: Classic Films of the Soviet Avant-garde. I.B.Tauris, 2001.

External links 
 

Soviet drama films
1921 drama films
1921 films
Russian silent feature films
1920s Russian-language films
Films directed by Vladimir Gardin
Soviet silent feature films
Silent drama films